Gora is a rural locality (a village) in Zadneselskoye Rural Settlement, Ust-Kubinsky  District, Vologda Oblast, Russia. The population was 12 as of 2002.

Geography 
The distance to Ustye is 36 km.

References 

Rural localities in Ust-Kubinsky District